The Great American Traffic Jam (alternate title Gridlock) is a 1980 American made-for-television movie which first aired on NBC on October 2, 1980.  The comedy revolves around a large "all-star" cast getting stuck in a massive Los Angeles area traffic jam, with multiple interweaving story lines among those stuck.

Background and reception
The movie debuted on NBC on Thursday October 2, 1980.   The TV Guide summary of the week's TV movies described it as a film that "provides stale characters in staler situations," but another promotional blurb in the same issue stated "what sets this 1980 TV-movie apart are its flashes of wit, delivered in a running commentary by a glib disc jockey (Howard Hesseman) and its satirically staged sequences--such as a helicopter's convoy's delivering portable toilets."

Though Ed McMahon refers to the movie as a "semiclassic" in his biography, Rue McClanahan (who plays his wife) admits she did it just to fill a contractual obligation with NBC and said "it was about as funny as Mom and Me, MD", a reference to another television movie she did in 1979.

On its debut, the movie was the 14th most watched primetime show of the week with a 17.8/30 rating.  The serious Holocaust drama Playing for Time, which won a number of Emmys, was the most watched program that week.

Writers Steve Hattman and Dave Hackel dreamed up the idea for the movie when they were stuck in an L.A. traffic jam.  It appears the original title of the film was "Gridlock", but there is no evidence of it ever being released under that title.  It was released on VHS in the United States in December 1987.

Primary cast
Though the cast is large, the opening credits billed cast are listed in alphabetical order as follows:
 Desi Arnaz Jr. - Robbie Reinhardt
 John Beck - Buzz Gregory
 Noah Beery - Barney
 René Enríquez - Mayor Julio Escontrerez 
 Shelley Fabares - Louise Gregory
 Phil Foster - Koppleman
 James Gregory - General Caruthers
 Lisa Hartman - Nikki
 Michael Lerner - Marv
 Rue McClanahan - Adele
 James McEachin - Speed-O
 Ed McMahon - Henry
 Al Molinaro - Sightseer
 Charles Napier - Sonny
 Christopher Norris - Linda Reinhardt (pregnant woman)
 Alan Sues - Dudley
 Vic Tayback - Floyd 'Snake' Kraslowski

Other actors appearing in the film include Lyle Waggoner, Abe Vigoda, Marcia Wallace, and Paul Willson; game show hosts Wink Martindale, Jack Clark, Art James, and Jim Perry; and Howard Hesseman (who was playing a DJ role on WKRP in Cincinnati at this time) as the voice of the radio announcer.

References

External links
   
 Great American Traffic Jam on YouTube

1980 television films
1980 films
American television films
Films set in Los Angeles
1980s English-language films